Brownsdale is a city in Red Rock Township, Mower County, Minnesota, United States. The population was 676 at the 2010 census.

History
Brownsdale was platted in 1856, and named for Andrew D. Brown, a businessman in the lumber industry. A post office has been in operation at Brownsdale since 1857. Brownsdale was incorporated in 1876.

Geography

Demographics

2010 census
As of the census of 2010, there were 676 people, 286 households, and 190 families living in the city. The racial makeup of the city was 98.1% White, 0.1% African American, 1.3% from other races, and 0.4% from two or more races. Hispanic or Latino of any race were 5.5% of the population.

There were 286 households, of which 30.1% had children under the age of 18 living with them, 48.6% were married couples living together, 13.3% had a female householder with no husband present, 4.5% had a male householder with no wife present, and 33.6% were non-families. 25.2% of all households were made up of individuals, and 14.7% had someone living alone who was 65 years of age or older. The average household size was 2.36 and the average family size was 2.83.

The median age in the city was 41.4 years. 24.6% of residents were under the age of 18; 5% were between the ages of 18 and 24; 24.1% were from 25 to 44; 28.5% were from 45 to 64; and 17.8% were 65 years of age or older. The gender makeup of the city was 46.7% male and 53.3% female.

2000 census
As of the census of 2000, there were 718 people, 290 households, and 198 families living in the city. The racial makeup of the city was 95.40% White, 3.48% from other races, and 1.11% from two or more races. Hispanic or Latino of any race were 3.48% of the population.

There were 290 households, out of which 30.7% had children under the age of 18 living with them, 55.9% were married couples living together, 8.3% had a female householder with no husband present, and 31.7% were non-families. 26.9% of all households were made up of individuals, and 13.4% had someone living alone who was 65 years of age or older.  The average household size was 2.48 and the average family size was 2.97.

In the city, the population was spread out, with 26.3% under the age of 18, 8.9% from 18 to 24, 26.0% from 25 to 44, 20.8% from 45 to 64, and 18.0% who were 65 years of age or older.  The median age was 37 years. For every 100 females, there were 102.8 males.  For every 100 females age 18 and over, there were 98.9 males.

The median income for a household in the city was $32,857, and the median income for a family was $43,864. Males had a median income of $31,842 versus $22,031 for females. The per capita income for the city was $15,778.  About 4.5% of families and 7.4% of the population were below the poverty line, including 4.3% of those under age 18 and 10.3% of those age 65 or over.

See also
Brownsdale Public Library

References

Cities in Minnesota
Cities in Mower County, Minnesota